Just One is the debut album by the hardcore band Better Than a Thousand, released in 1997. Originally just intended to be a fun project, Ray Cappo, Graham Land and Ken Olden recorded some hardcore songs at Issa Diao's (of Good Clean Fun) studio in Atlanta. After releasing this album, the band gained a large following. This was mainly because Better Than a Thousand's sound reminds a lot of people of Ray's old band Youth of Today, only then slightly updated to the melodic hardcore style that was famous around 1997.

Track listing
"Live Today" - 2:28
"It Never Rains" - 1:58
"Just One" - 1:46
"Motivation" - 1:22
"We Spoke Our Minds" - 2:34
"Nightclub" - 2:04
"You Were The One" - 2:15
"Alternative Nation" - 1:52
"When Seasons Change" - 2:24
"Is It Education...?" - 1:42
"Apology" - 2:40
"Sunshine" - 1:15

Credits
Ray Cappo - vocals
Ken Olden - drums
Graham Land - guitar
Jeff Neumann - bass 
Issa Diao - engineer
Tom Bejgrowicz - artwork

1997 debut albums
Better Than a Thousand albums